This is a list of the Austrian Singles Chart number-one hits of 2006.

See also
2006 in music

References

Number-one hits
Austria
2006